San Vicente Reservoir is a reservoir created by the San Vicente Dam in San Diego County, California.

Description
The reservoir is formed by impounding the waters of San Vicente Creek, and the Colorado River via the First San Diego Aqueduct branch of the Colorado River Aqueduct from Lake Havasu.  It is the largest reservoir in the city of San Diego, with a storage capacity of 249,358.0 AF (https://www.sandiego.gov/water/recreation/levels)

In 2009, construction began of a $568 million project to increase the size of San Vicente Reservoir twofold. San Diego County Water Authority officials are hoping to receive funding from Proposition 18 (the $11.1 billion bond to upgrade the Californian water supply), but will continue the upgrade without these funds if the Proposition is unsuccessful.

Recreation
The reservoir is a popular place for fishing, boating, waterskiing and wakeboarding.

See also
 San Vicente Reservoir - City of San Diego
 List of reservoirs and dams in California
 List of lakes in California

References

External links
 
 
 

Reservoirs in San Diego County, California
Cuyamaca Mountains
Reservoirs in California
Reservoirs in Southern California